HMS Achilles was an armoured frigate built for the Royal Navy in the 1860s. Upon her completion in 1864 she was assigned to the Channel Fleet. The ship was paid off in 1868 to refit and be re-armed. When she recommissioned in 1869, she was assigned as the guard ship of the Fleet Reserve in the Portland District until 1874. Achilles was refitted and re-armed again in 1874 and became the guard ship of the Liverpool District in 1875. Two years later, she was rejoined the Channel Fleet before going to the Mediterranean in 1878. The ship returned to the Channel Fleet in 1880 and served until she was paid off in 1885.

Achilles was recommissioned in 1901 as a depot ship at Malta under a succession of different names. She was transferred to Chatham in 1914 and was again renamed multiple times before she was sold for scrap in 1923. Achilles had more changes of her rigging and armament than any other British warship, before or since.

Design and description
Achilles was the third member of the 1861 Naval Programme and was designed as an improved version of the earlier  armoured frigates with a complete waterline armour belt.

She displaced  and had a tonnage of 6,121 bm. The hull was subdivided by watertight transverse bulkheads into 106 compartments and had a double bottom. Achilles was designed with a high centre of gravity and was very stiff. So much so that the ship only rolled 10 degrees during one storm that ripped the main and mizen topgallant masts off and split her topsails. Because of her great length she was not very manoeuvrable. Achilles had a crew of 709 officers and ratings.

Propulsion
The ship had a single two-cylinder trunk steam engine made by John Penn and Sons driving a single  propeller.

As built, Achilles was ship-rigged with four masts, called bow, fore, main and mizen from fore to aft, and she was the only British warship ever to have four masts. Her performance was unsatisfactory when the wind was before the beam and her bowsprit and bowmast were removed in June 1865 in an attempt to correct this problem. However, now she had too much weather helm so the bowsprit was replaced and the foremast was moved forward  in July 1866. In 1877 Achilles was rerigged as a barque. Both of her funnels were retractable to reduce wind resistance while under sail alone.

Armament
The intended armament of Achilles changed no less than five times before it was finally mounted. She received four rifled 110-pounder breech-loading guns mounted on the upper deck, two of which served as chase guns at the bow and stern, and 16 smoothbore, muzzle-loading 100-pounder Somerset cannon, eight on each side on the main deck. The breech-loading guns were a new design from Armstrong and much was hoped for them. Firing tests carried out in September 1861 against an armoured target, however, proved that the 110-pounder was inferior to the 68-pounder smoothbore gun in armour penetration and repeated incidents of breech explosions during the Battles for Shimonoseki and the Bombardment of Kagoshima in 1863–1864 caused the navy to withdraw the gun from service shortly afterwards. In 1865, six 68-pounder smoothbores were added, three on each side of the main deck, although she was not comprehensively rearmed until her 1868 refit.

All of the guns could fire both solid shot and explosive shells.

Achilles was rearmed during her 1867–68 refit with 22 seven-inch and eight  rifled muzzle-loading guns. The eight-inch guns and 18 seven-inch guns were mounted on the main deck and the remaining seven-inch guns replaced the 110-pounders on the upper deck. It was credited with the ability to penetrate  armour.

In 1874 the ship was rearmed with 16 nine-inch rifled muzzle-loaders replacing the 4 eight-inch and 20 of the 22 seven-inch guns. Fourteen of the  guns were mounted on the main deck and the other two replaced the seven-inch chase guns. The two remaining seven-inch guns stayed in their position on the quarterdeck. As the nine-inch guns were considerably bigger than their predecessors, the gun ports had to be widened to accommodate them.

Armour
The ship had a wrought-iron waterline armour belt that ran the full length of the ship. The main deck was protected by a strake of armour, also 4.5-inch thick and 212 feet long. To protect against raking fire the upper strake was closed off by 4.5-inch transverse bulkheads at each end.

Construction and career
Achilles, named after the Greek mythological hero, was ordered on 10 April 1861 from the Chatham Dockyard. She was the first iron-hulled warship to be built at a royal dockyard and her construction was delayed by the need to acquire the necessary machinery to handle iron and to train the workers to use it. The ship was laid down on 1 August 1861 in a drydock and was floated out rather than being launched on 23 December 1863. Achilles was completed on 26 November 1864 at the cost of £469,572.

She served in the Channel Fleet until 1868. After a refit and her first major re-armament, Achilles became the guardship at Portland until 1874 when she was again re-armed. Upon its completion in 1875, the ship became guardship at Liverpool until 1877 when Captain William Hewett, VC, assumed command. In 1878 she was one of the ships in the Particular Service Squadron which Admiral Geoffrey Hornby took through the Dardanelles at the time of the Russian war scare in June–August 1878 during the Russo-Turkish War. Achilles accidentally collided with the flagship of the Mediterranean Fleet, on 4 October 1879, but was only lightly damaged by Alexandras propeller. The ship rejoined the Channel Fleet in 1880 and was paid off in 1885.

She lay derelict in the Hamoaze until April 1901, when she was sent to Malta as a depot ship. To release her name for the new armoured cruiser, Achilles was renamed Hibernia in 1902. She was renamed Egmont in March 1904, and remained in Malta until 1914. Her role in Malta was assumed by the stone frigate Fort St Angelo. She was brought home to Chatham that year, and served there as a depot ship under the successive names of Egremont (19 June 1916) and Pembroke (6 June 1919). The ship was sold for scrap on 26 January 1923 to the Granton Shipbreaking Co.

The Achilles in Literature
Charles Dickens offered a short meditation on the construction of HMS Achilles following a visit to Chatham Dockyard in 1863, first published in the weekly magazine All the Year Round on August 29, 1863, and then included in his collection The Uncommercial Traveller. Dickens came away impressed by the experience, and the idea that such a large iron construction could float or move. "To think that this Achilles, monstrous compound of iron tank and oaken chest, can ever swim or roll!  To think that any force of wind and wave could ever break her!"

Notes

Footnotes

References
 

 

Battleships of the Royal Navy
Ships built in Chatham
1863 ships
Victorian-era battleships of the United Kingdom
Maritime incidents in October 1879